Isabel Coixet Castillo (born 9 April 1960 ) is a Spanish film director. She is one of the most prolific film directors of contemporary Spain, having directed twelve feature-length films since the beginning of her film career in 1988, in addition to documentary films, shorts, and commercials. Her films depart from the traditional national cinema of Spain, and help to “untangle films from their national context ... clearing the path for thinking about national film from different perspectives.” The recurring themes of “emotions, feelings, and existential conflict” coupled with her distinct visual style secure the “multifaceted (she directs, writes, produces, shoots, and acts)” filmmaker's status as a “Catalan auteur.”

Early life 
Isabel Coixet was born in Sant Adrià del Besòs next to Barcelona on 9 April 1960. She started filming when she was given an 8 mm camera on the occasion of her First Communion. After obtaining a BA degree in history at Barcelona University, where she majored in Eighteenth- and Nineteenth-Century History, she worked in advertising and spot writing for the cinema magazine Fotogramas. She continued in the world of advertising, standing out as creative director of the agency JWT.

Her clients included BMW, Renault and Ikea. She won several accolades for her spots, but the ads did not fulfill her expectations.

Coixet made her first short film in 1984: Mira y verás.

Career 
In 1988, Coixet made her debut as a scriptwriter and director in Demasiado Viejo Para Morir Joven (Too Old to Die Young). For this movie, she was nominated at the Goya Awards as a Best New Director.

In 1996, she traveled to the United States to shoot her first English-language feature film, entitled Things I Never Told You (Cosas que nunca te dije). This moving drama cast American actors led by Lili Taylor and Andrew McCarthy. Coixet received her second nomination at the Goya Awards for Best Original Screenplay. Coixet then connected with a French production company, and in 1998 she shot — for the first time in Spain and in Spanish — the historical adventure A los que aman. Two years later she founded her own production company, with which she produced her most acclaimed film to date, Mi vida sin mí (My Life Without Me). Since then she has been one of the most acclaimed directors of Spanish cinema.

In 2000, she founded her own production company called Miss Wasabi Films, for which she has produced over 400 commercials.

Her international success came in 2003 thanks to the intimate drama My Life Without Me. The film was based on a short story by Nancy Kincaid. Canadian actress Sarah Polley played Ann, a young mother who decides to hide from her family that she has terminal cancer. This Hispanic-Canadian co-production was highly praised at the Berlin International Film Festival.

Coixet then continued working with Polley as her lead actress with the film The Secret Life of Words, which was released in 2005 and also starred Tim Robbins and Javier Cámara. The film was awarded four Goyas: Best Film, Best Director, Best Production and Best Screenplay.

In 2005, Coixet joined eighteen other international filmmakers, among them Gus Van Sant, Walter Salles and Joel and Ethan Cohen, to make the groundbreaking collective project Paris, je t’aime, in which each director explored a different Paris quarter.

Coixet has also made prominent documentaries on major themes, such as Invisibles, which was selected for the "Panorama" section of the 2007 Berlin Film Festival, about the international medical organization Doctors Without Borders. Also the documentary Journey to the Heart of Torture, which was filmed in Sarajevo during the Balkan War and won an award at the October 2003 Human Rights Film Festival.

In April 2006, she was honored with the Creu de San Jordi De Cine Awards by the Generalitat de Catalunya. The Barcelona director received not one but two awards. In addition to the critical award for The Secret Life of Words (La vida secreta de las palabras) as the best Spanish film, she also received the Rosa de Sant Jordi prize, voted by the audience of Radio Nacional de España (RNE), for the best production. The award ceremony was held at the Palau de la Música.

In 2008, Coixet released Elegy, which was filmed in Vancouver and produced by Lakeshore Entertainment. The film was based on Philip Roth's novel The Dying Animal, was written for the screen by Nicholas Meyer, and starred Penélope Cruz and Ben Kingsley. Elegy was presented at the 58th Berlin International Film Festival.

In 2009, as an official selection of the Cannes Film Festival, she premiered the film Map of the Sounds of Tokyo, shot in both Japan and Barcelona and starring Rinko Kikuchi, Sergi López and Min Tanaka, with a script by Coixet herself. And at the Centre D'Art Santa Mònica, she inaugurated From I to J, an installation in honor of the work of John Berger.

That same year she received the gold medal for Fine Arts and was also part of the jury of the 59th edition of the Berlin Film Festival.

In April 2009 at the Centre d'Arts Santa Mónica in Barcelona and in April 2010 at La Casa Encendida in Madrid, Coixet presented a monographic exhibition dedicated to the British writer, art critic, poet and artist John Berger entitled From I to J. A tribute by Isabel Coixet to John Berger, with the collaboration of the architect Benedetta Tagliabue and the participation of the actresses Penélope Cruz, Monica Bellucci, Isabelle Huppert, Maria de Medeiros, Sarah Polley, Tilda Swinton and Leonor Watling.

Also in 2009 she directed a short documentary called La mujer es cosa de hombres about male violence and the media. for a project entitled "50 years of..." about the history of Catalonia.

In 2010, she took on responsibility for the content of one of the three Spanish Pavilion lounges for the Expo Shanghai. Plus, she inaugurated the exhibition Aral. The Lost Sea, which shows her documentary with the same title, shot in Uzbekistan in 2009.

In 2011, within the "Berlinale Specials" section of the Berlin Film Festival, she premiered the documentary Listening to Judge Garzón giving voice to the Spanish magistrate through an interview with writer Manuel Rivas. The film won the Goya in the Best Documentary category.

During 2012, she directed a documentary about the 10 years of the Prestige disaster and the volunteers who participated in the recovery of the Galician coasts under the title White Tide.

That same year, Coixet shot and produced Ayer no termina nunca (Yesterday Never Ends) which premiered in the Panorama Section of the 63rd edition of the International Film Festival of Berlin. The film also opened the Málaga Film Festival the same year, where it won four Silver Biznagas in the categories Special Jury Prize, Best Actress, Best Photography and Best Editing, the last two prizes won by Jordi Azategui. In the end of 2012 she also started shooting a new project, which she finished in 2013, called Another Me, an English-language thriller written and directed by Coixet with a cast that featured Sophie Turner, Rhys Ifans, Jonathan Rhys-Meyers and Geraldine Chaplin, among others.

In the summer of 2013 she started shooting Learning to Drive, an American production developed in New York City, based on an article published in The New York Times and starring Sir Ben Kingsley and Patricia Clarkson, with whom Isabel Coixet had already worked in Elegy. It premiered at the Toronto International Film Festival and won the Grolsch People's Choice Award.

Nobody Wants The Night was her next project, filmed in Norway, Bulgaria and the Canary Islands. The film starred Juliette Binoche, Rinko Kikuchi and Gabriel Byrne. The film opened the 66th Berlin International Film Festival to competition.

Coixet is always interested in shooting documentaries to denounce what she doesn't agree with or to give voice to her protagonists. She shot a documentary in Chad at the end of 2014 narrated by Juliette Binoche entitled Talking about Rose: Prisoner of Hissène Habré. The piece relates the experience of a group of torture victims in their struggle to bring the former Chadian dictator to justice, an effort led by US human rights lawyer Reed Brody.

During the 2015 edition of the Málaga Festival, the prize was awarded to her entire career and it was presented a retrospective documentary of her work, commissioned by the Festival itself, Words, Maps, Secrets And Other Things, directed by Elena Trapé.

Also in 2015 she received the recognized prize of the French Ministry of Culture of Knight of Arts and Letters.

During 2015 and 2016, Isabel Coixet directs the project Spain in a Day, the Spanish version of the documentary crowdsourcing project produced by Mediapro. The project aims to portray the reality of a country reflected by hundreds of domestic videos recorded during the same day and that has had as direct precedents Britain in a Day and Italy in a Day. In the case of Spain in a Day, the videos were recorded on 24 October 2015 by thousands of volunteers.

In the summer of 2016 she directed the feature film The Bookshop (La librería). The script adapted by Coixet was based on the novel of the same name by the English writer Penelope Fitzgerald and received the prize for the best literary adaptation at the Frankfurt Book Fair in 2017. The film was shot in Northern Ireland and Barcelona, starring Emily Mortimer, Bill Nighy and Patricia Clarkson. The Bookshop inaugurated the SEMINCI 2017, as a world premiere, receiving good reviews and it was commercially released in Spain on November 10, with a very positive critical reception and great public success.

The Bookshop was premiered outside Spain in a "Berlinale Special Gala" at the 68th edition of the Berlin International Film Festival, which took place in February 2018.

In February 2019, Coixet released the film Elisa y Marcela in collaboration with Netflix. The film, based on the first registered same-sex marriage in Spain, was the third original Spanish film by Netflix.

On 4 September 2020, the Spanish Ministry of Culture and Sports announced that Isabel Coixet would be awarded the National Film Award 2020. The award was presented at the San Sebastian International Film Festival.

Productions 
Isabel Coixet created her own production company in 2000, Miss Wasabi, with the vocation to self-produce her own more personal projects. The production company has dedicated itself basically to advertising, the making of video clips, documentaries and a fictional feature film, but also to projects outside the audiovisual sector, such as exhibitions, books and other types of cultural projects. Among the main projects, directed and produced by Isabel Coixet, are the documentary 'Aral, el mar perdido' (2009), 'From I to J' (2010), 'Escuchando al Juez Garzón' (2011), the feature film 'Ayer no termina nunca' (2013), or "Talking about Rose. Prisoner of Hissène Habré" (2015).

50 años de... 
On the occasion of the celebration of the 50th anniversary of TVE Catalunya (TVE Cataluña) Isabel Coixet, along with fifteen other Catalan documentary filmmakers, had the idea of capturing in images, taken from the archive of Televisión Española, the last half Spanish century. The programme 50 years of... (50 años de…) is in honor of the fiftieth anniversary of the first TVE broadcast in Catalonia, whose first headquarters was the mythical Miramar Hotel in Barcelona, which was maintained for twenty-four years, until 1983, when the production center was moved to San Cugat del Vallés. There has been a second season, as well as a third entitled Cómo hemos cambiado.

Personal life and political views
Coixet has a daughter, Zoe, born in 1997, and lives in Barcelona with her boyfriend, Reed Brody, a human rights lawyer.

In October 2012 Coixet was one of the signatories of the "Call to the federalist and left-wing Catalonia" manifesto, asking the Catalan left-wing for an unabashed federalist stance vis-à-vis the State. She openly declared her opposition to the October 2017 independence referendum held in Catalonia, signing another manifesto calling on people not to take part in the vote. In April 2020 she signed a manifesto to say "enough" to the "Catalan government's political mismanagement" and "its unsupportive and irresponsible statements" on the coronavirus crisis.

Style and themes 
Coixet's work as a director is striking for being, as The New York Times describes her, “unclassifiable.” Depending on the film, she shoots in English or Spanish, and subjects are diverse. Coixet's trademark is her filmmaking technique, which was derived from her background in advertising, where visuals, color, and composition are carefully constructed. She works as the camera operator on all of her films.

Among her most recurrent themes we can find a concern for communication, for words as a way of conventional understanding between people and that usually do not have the effect we expect. As she herself has acknowledged on occasion, she is obsessed with those situations in which messages do not reach their recipient.

Another of her signs of identity is her marked social commitment, both with themes such as global warming (which she showed in 'The Secret Life of Words') and with social themes (documentaries such as the one made to Judge Garzón are a good example).

Love and solitude are also constant in her cinema, in a very deep and spiritual way, nothing topical and stereotyped, although there is a common place recognizable in several of her productions that is the laundry.

The filmmaker's approach to her characters and their stories is surprising because of her ability to get them in deep. To offer them to the spectator with a simple but tremendously transparent view.

This search for connection is influenced by one of her great referents: the poet John Berger, from whom she draws, in his own words, the conviction that "anything can explain the world" through the connection between poetry, philosophy, etc.

In Coixet's universe, spiritual connections between people are combined with a strong social consciousness, always ready to denounce the injustices of the world.

In addition, Isabel Coixet's political and feminist involvement is evident. For example, The Secret Life of Words is a film that denounces the rape of a certain woman in a certain conflict: the Balkan War.

Filmography

Feature films

Producer only
 Clue (2008) (Executive Producer)
 Nobody's Watching (2017) (Co-producer)
 The Distances (2018) (Associate producer)

Short films

Documentaries

Documentary films

Documentary short films

Television

Music videos

Awards 

Goya Awards

Medals of the Circle of Cinematographic Writers

Feroz Awards

Forqué Awards

Gaudí Awards

Butaca Awards

Other Awards

 National Film and Audiovisual Prize of Catalonia (2002) for the film My Life Without Me.
 Premio Creu de Sant Jordi de cine (2006).
 Ojo Crítico de Cine Award in its XIV Edition for the film, My Life Without Me, for the “sincerity and sensitivity of its cinematographic language”.
 Knight of the Order of Arts and Letters (2015) for his contribution to the world of art and culture
 Atlantida Award from the Catalan Publishers (2016)
 Award for the Best Literary Adaptation at the Frankfurt Book Fair 2017, for the adapted script of The Bookshop.
 International Award Yo Dona 2018
 Premio Nacional de Cinematografía de España 2020.

Books 

 My Life Without Me (Mi vida sin mí) (2003)
 La vida es un guión (2004)
 La vida secreta de las palabras (2005)
 Mapa de los sonidos de Tokio (2009)
 Isabel Muñoz (2009)
 From I to J (2009)
 Alguien debería prohibir los domingos por la tarde (2011)
 La vida secreta de Isabel Coixet (2011)

See also
 List of female film and television directors
 List of LGBT-related films directed by women

References

Further reading 

 Zecchi, Barbara (2017). "Tras las lentes de Isabel Coixet: cine, compromiso y feminismo". University of Zaragoza Press.

External links 
 
 Miss Wasabi Films

1960 births
Living people
Female music video directors
Film directors from Catalonia
Spanish music video directors
Spanish women film directors
Spanish women screenwriters
Best Director Goya Award winners
People from Barcelona
University of Barcelona alumni
20th-century Spanish screenwriters
21st-century Spanish screenwriters